The Samum (former MRK-17) is a  in the Soviet Navy and later the Russian Navy.

Construction and career 
MRK-17 was laid down in September 1991 and launched on 12 October 1992 at the A.M. Gorky Shipyard, Zelenodolsk and commissioned into the Baltic Fleet on 26 February 2000.

On 19 March 1992, the vessel was renamed Samum.

On 25 July 2002, Samum was put into the Black Sea Fleet.

Pennant numbers

Citations 

Ships built in Russia
1992 ships
Corvettes of the Russian Navy
Ships involved in the 2022 Russian invasion of Ukraine